Aliağa Gençlik S.K., known as Aliağa Petkim for sponsorship reasons, was a professional basketball team from the district of Aliağa in İzmir, Turkey. Their home arena was the Enka Sport Hall with a capacity of 2,500 seats. The team competes playing in the Turkish Basketball League.

History
Aliağa Petkim was established in 1993, and continued playing in the ranks of TB2L until in 2008-09 season. The team was promoted to the Turkish Basketball League after finishing second position in the TB2L in 2008. 

In the 2012–13 season, the team played in the EuroChallenge Qualifying Round. Here it lost against Kataja from Finland.

After the team was relegated from the TBL in the 2013–14 season, the club was dissolved.

Season by season

Notable players 

  Barış Güney
  Ceyhun Altay
  Fatih Solak
  Ümit Sonkol
  Kaspars Kambala
  Branislav Ratkovica
  Aubrey Coleman
  Aubrey Reese
  Brian Qvale
 - Charles Davis
  Jack McClinton
  Jerome Randle
  Jarvis Hayes
  Tu Holloway 
  Mike James
  Ryan Toolson
 - Quinton Hosley
  Torin Francis
  Marek Klassen

External links

 Eurobasket.com Profile
 TBLStat.net Profile

References

Basketball teams established in 1993
Basketball teams disestablished in 2014
Basketball teams in Turkey
Turkish Basketball Super League teams
Sports teams in İzmir